Los Corales de Buelna is a municipality in Cantabria, Spain.

Politics
The current mayor of the municipality is Ignacio Argumosa, from [PRC].

Demographic development

Source: INE

References

External links
Ayuntamiento de Los Corrales de Buelna
Los Corrales de Buelna - Cantabria 102 Municipios

Municipalities in Cantabria